In thermodynamics, a temperature–entropy (T–s) diagram is a thermodynamic diagram used to visualize changes to temperature and specific entropy during a thermodynamic process or cycle as the graph of a curve. It is a useful and common tool, particularly because it helps to visualize the heat transfer during a process. For reversible (ideal) processes, the area under the T–s curve of a process is the heat transferred to the system during that process.

Working fluids are often categorized on the basis of the shape of their T–s diagram.

An isentropic process is depicted as a vertical line on a T–s diagram, whereas an isothermal process is a horizontal line.

See also
Carnot cycle
Pressure–volume diagram
Rankine cycle
Saturation vapor curve
Working fluid
Working fluid selection

References

Thermodynamics